Seidu Salifu is a Ghanaian footballer who last played for Ümraniyespor in Turkey  after a short spell at Adana Demirspor  Formerly of Club Africain in the Tunisian Ligue Professionnelle 1, he plays as a midfielder. In 2013, coach Sellas Tetteh called him up to be a member of the Ghana Under 20 national team for the 2013 African Youth Championship in Algeria, and he was a member of the Ghana Under 20 national team for the 2013 FIFA U-20 World Cup in Turkey. In March 2015, he got his debut call up into Ghana national football team.

Career

Early career
Salifu began his youth career playing for Tamale Young Kotoko in the Ghana Juvenile Association Colts League.

Club career

Salifu  came to prominence in 2010 when he moved to All Stars F.C. He had a remarkable three-year spell at the club especially in 2012 and after his success in the games of the 2013 African U-20 Championship qualification, Salifu was highly sought after by top teams in Ghana including Asante Kotoko SC.
After playing a key role for the Black Satellites at the FIFA U-20 Championship 2013 in Turkey he moved to the Tunisian side Club Africain.
In July 2015, Salifu turned down a trial with Bundesliga side Hamburger SV. On 27 August 2016, Seidu Salifu agreed terms to play for Adana Demirspor in Turkey and managed just one league appearance.
Salifu joined Ümraniyespor after six months

International career

African Youth Championship
Salifu was part of the Ghana Under-20 national team during the qualification rounds for the 2013 African U-20 Championship. In 2013, coach Sellas Tetteh called him up for the Ghana Under-20 national team for the 2013 tournament in Algeria. During the competition he scored from a long distance in the group match game against Algeria.

FIFA U-20 Championship, Turkey 2013
Salifu was a member of the Ghana Under-20 national team that took part and in the 2013 FIFA U-20 tournament in Turkey. He scored one of Ghana's goal in the 4–3 win over Chile in the quarter finals.

Ghana national team
In March 2015, Salifu was called up to the Ghana squad to face Senegal national football team and Mali national football team.

Career statistics

Honours

Club
Club Africain
Tunisian Ligue Professionnelle 1 (1): 2014–15

International

Ghana
 U-20 World Cup: Third Place 2013
 African Youth Championship: Runners up 2013

References

External links
 Seidu Salifu at TFF

1993 births
Living people
Ghanaian footballers
Ghana under-20 international footballers
Ghanaian expatriate footballers
2013 African U-20 Championship players
Club Africain players
Ümraniyespor footballers
Legon Cities FC players
Expatriate footballers in Tunisia
Association football midfielders
People from Tamale, Ghana